Caroline Harvey may refer to:
  Caroline Harvey, pseudonym of English writer Joanna Trollope
 Caroline Harvey (ice hockey), American ice hockey player